The Local Government Association (LGA) is the national membership body for local authorities. Its core membership is made up of 339 English councils and the 22 Welsh councils through the Welsh Local Government Association.  

The LGA is politically-led and cross-party. As the national voice of local government, it works on behalf of councils to give local government a voice with national government, to promote the reputation of the sector and to secure funding and powers on behalf of councils and the communities they serve. It aims to support councils to improve and innovate through peer-based support, and it co-ordinates collective legal actions on behalf of the sector.

The LGA also provides membership services to other organisations through an associate scheme, including fire and rescue  authorities, national parks authorities, town councils, police & crime commissioners and elected mayors of combined authorities.

The chairman of the LGA is Councillor James Jamieson and the chief executive is Mark Lloyd.

History
On 1 April 1997, the Association of County Councils, the Association of District Councils and the Association of Metropolitan Authorities came together to form a single membership body for local government in England – the Local Government Association (LGA). 

In 2010, the LGA merged with the Improvement and Development Agency (IDeA), Local Government Employers (LGE), Local Authority Co-ordinators of Regulatory Services (LACORS) and the Leadership Centre for Local Government. The IDeA, whilst wholly owned by the LGA, continues to exist as a company and the recipient of central government grant for improvement activities. The Leadership Centre is now an independent body based in North London.

In April 2019, the former unincorporated LGA was replaced by the LGA unlimited company, enabling it to hold title to its two properties – its headquarters in Smith Square, Westminster and the former IDeA headquarters in Farringdon.

The LGA’s annual meeting – the General Assembly - takes place on the first Tuesday of July each year. The 2019 assembly passed a motion declaring a climate emergency and calling on government to explore the domestic implementation of the UN Sustainable Development Goals (SDGs) through funded partnership roles with local authority areas and encouraging councils to continue to link local priorities with the overall ambitions of the SDGs.

Chairs of the LGA 
 Jeremy Beecham (1997–2004)
 Lord Bruce-Lockhart (2004–2007)
 Sir Simon Milton (2007–2008)
 Margaret Eaton, Baroness Eaton (2008–2011)
 Sir Merrick Cockell (2011–2014)
 David Sparks (2014–2015)
 Gary Porter, Lord Porter of Spalding (2015–2019)
 James Jamieson (2019–present)

Board directors

Main priorities

The LGA's published business plan sets out the association's main lobbying priorities for 2019-22. They are:

Funding for local government 
Adult social care, health and wellbeing
Children, education and schools
Places to live and work
Strong local democracy
Sustainability and climate action

Associated companies

The LGA has a number of associated companies.

 GeoPlace is a joint venture between the LGA and Ordnance Survey
 LGA (Digital Services) is a partnership between the LGA and Brent Council
 Public Sector Audit Appointments Ltd is wholly owned by the LGA through the IDeA company
 LGA Commercial Services Ltd is wholly owned by the LGA
 The LGA is a founder member of the Local Government Mutual (LGM) and a shareholder in the UK Municipal Bonds Agency (UKMBA)
 Local Partnerships is a joint venture between the LGA, HM Treasury and the Welsh Government

See also
Australian Local Government Association
Convention of Scottish Local Authorities
Joint Contracts Tribunal
Local Councils Association of the Punjab

References

External links

 The Welsh Local Government Association (Cymdeithas Llywodraeth Leol Cymru)
 The Local Government Chronicle — The leading site for local government news
LocalGov.co.uk — News updates on UK local government
Local Government Careers
Local Government Channel

 
1997 establishments in England
1997 establishments in Wales
Government agencies established in 1997
Local government in England
Local government in Wales
Organisations based in the City of Westminster
Local government organizations
Council of European Municipalities and Regions